The voiced palatal lateral approximant is a type of consonantal sound used in some spoken languages.

Many languages that were previously thought to have a palatal lateral approximant actually have a lateral approximant that is, broadly, alveolo-palatal; that is to say, it is articulated at a place in-between the alveolar ridge and the hard palate (excluded), and it may be variously described as alveolo-palatal, lamino-postalveolar, or postalveolo-prepalatal. That is likely the case for several other languages listed here. Some languages, like Portuguese and Catalan, have a lateral approximant that varies between alveolar and alveolo-palatal.

There is no dedicated symbol in the International Phonetic Alphabet that represents the alveolo-palatal lateral approximant. There is also a non-IPA letter  ("l", plus the curl found in the symbols for alveolo-palatal sibilant fricatives ), used especially in Sinological circles.

The voiced palatal lateral approximant contrasts phonemically with its voiceless counterpart  in the Xumi language spoken in China.

Features 
Features of the voiced palatal lateral approximant:

Occurrence

See also 
Yeísmo, a feature of Spanish dialects that have merged this sound with 
Index of phonetics articles

Notes

References 

 

 

Lateral consonants
Palatal consonants
Alveolo-palatal consonants
Pulmonic consonants
Oral consonants